The PNS Bahadur is the naval station and the largest operations training facility located in the urban neighborhood of Karsaz in Karachi that provides operations education on the subjects of Navigation, Radars warfare, Hyderography, Communication warfare,  Surface warfare, Underwater Warfare, Weapons Training Section, and Information Technology warfare for the Navy's enlisted personnel upon their passing out from the PNS Himalaya— the Navy's only basic training boot camp in Manora Island in Karachi coast, Sindh, in Pakistan.

The PNS Bahadur serves its purpose of conducting the instructional basis operational education that ranges from the basic–to-mid–to–advance level professional courses on various subjects and military operations for its Operations Branch. Established in 1980, the PNS Bahadur is a well-established and large complex covering  that consists of a single administration building and various schools including the CMWTC auditorium, library on military history, and dormitory that houses its personnel.

Training on military operations and Information Technology is not restricted to the Navy's enlisted personnel but enlisted personnel from Marines, Army, and Air Force have also been educated, certified, and earned their badges of qualifications from the PNS Bahadur.

History 

PNS Bahadur was commissioned in 1980.

All professional operations training is conducted in this establishment.

Training 

After 1981, all professional operations training shifted from PNS Himalaya to PNS Bahadur.

References 

Pakistan Navy bases
Pakistan Navy facilities